Type XXIII submarines were small, fast coastal craft, capable of remaining underwater indefinitely, fuel permitting, while at sea. This made them extremely dangerous to allied shipping and much better protected against allied counter-measures. Their main drawback was that they carried only two torpedoes, which severely limited their combat effectiveness. These boats appeared in the last two months of 1944 onward and were too late to have a major effect on the Second World War.

Due to their late arrival, the majority of these coastal submarines were never used in combat, and were scuttled either in Germany or in Operation Deadlight following the end of the war. These boats are listed below with construction and destruction information.

Type XXIII submarines

References

Notes

Bibliography

 uboat.net : Type XXIII Elektro boats

German Type XXIII